Highsmith is a surname. Notable people with the surname include:

Alex Highsmith (born 1997), American football player
Alonzo Highsmith (born 1965), American professional football player
Carol M. Highsmith (born 1946) American photographer, author, and publisher
Don Highsmith (born 1948), American football player
Jim Highsmith (born 1945), author of multiple books in the field of software development methodology
Margaret Highsmith Dickson, Democratic member of the North Carolina General Assembly
Patricia Highsmith (1921–1995), American novelist

See also 
Highsmith (album), a 2017 album by Craig Taborn and Ikue Mori